National People's Front may refer to:

 Rastriya Janamorcha, a communist political party in Nepal
 National People's Front (South Africa), a South African political party